Christiaan Moltzer (12 August 1875 – 20 September 1945) was a Dutch sports shooter. He competed in two events at the 1920 Summer Olympics.

References

External links
 

1875 births
1945 deaths
Dutch male sport shooters
Olympic shooters of the Netherlands
Shooters at the 1920 Summer Olympics
Sportspeople from Amsterdam